Krystian Prymula (born 17 March 1983 in Świdnica) is a German-Polish footballer is currently a free agent.

References

External links 
 
 

1983 births
Living people
German footballers
Polish footballers
Association football forwards
Chemnitzer FC players
Rot Weiss Ahlen players
2. Bundesliga players
Zagłębie Sosnowiec players
SV Yeşilyurt players
People from Świdnica
Sportspeople from Lower Silesian Voivodeship